There are currently seven official public holidays in mainland China. Each year's holidays are announced about three weeks before the start of the year by the General Office of the State Council. A notable feature of mainland Chinese holidays is that weekends are usually swapped with the weekdays next to the actual holiday to create a longer holiday period.

History
Festivals in China have been around since the Qin dynasty around 221–206 BC. During the more prosperous Tang dynasty from AD 618–907, festivals involved less sacrifice and mystery to more entertainment. Culminating to the modern era Between the 1920s until around the 1970s, the Chinese began observing two sets of holidays, which were the traditional and what became "official", celebrating the accomplishments of the communist regime. There was then a major reform in 2008, abolishing the Labour Day Golden Week and adding three traditional Chinese holidays (Qingming Festival, Duanwu Festival, and Mid-Autumn Festival). From at least 2000 until this reform, the Spring Festival public holiday began on New Year's Day itself. From 2008 to 2013 it was shifted back by one day to begin on Chinese New Year's Eve. In 2014, New Year's Eve became a working day again, which provoked hostile discussion by netizens and academics. However, since 2015, Chinese New Year's Eve is usually swapped with nearby weekends so that people need not work on Chinese New Year's Eve.

Overview
Holidays in China are complicated and are one of the least predictable among developing nations. 
In all these holidays, if the holiday lands on a weekend, the days will be reimbursed after the weekend.

The Chinese New Year and National Day holidays are three days long. The week-long holidays on May (Labor) Day and National Day began in 2000, as a measure to increase and encourage holiday spending. The resulting seven-day or eight-day (if Mid-Autumn Festival is near National Day) holidays are called "Golden Weeks", and have become peak seasons for travel and tourism. In 2008, the Labor Day holiday was shortened to three days to reduce travel rushes to just twice a year, and instead, three traditional Chinese holidays were added.

Generally, if there is a three-day or four-day (if Mid-Autumn Festival is near National Day) holiday, the government will declare it to be a seven-day or eight-day holiday. However, citizens are required to work during a nearby weekend. Businesses and schools would then treat the affected Saturdays and Sundays as the weekdays that the weekend has been swapped with. Schedules are released late in the year prior and might change during the year.

The following is a graphical schematic of how the weekend shifting works.

Weekend shifting scheme (since 2014)

Spring Festival
Shift the Saturdays and Sundays nearby to make a 7-day holiday. People may need to work for 6 or 7 continuous days before or after the holiday.

National Day (not near Mid-Autumn Festival)
Shift the Saturdays and Sundays nearby to make a 7-day holiday. The holiday is from 1 to 7 October. People may need to work for 6 or 7 continuous days before or after the holiday.

New Year, Tomb-Sweeping Day, Labour Day, Dragon Boat Festival and Mid-Autumn Festival (not near National Day)
Wednesday: No weekend shifting. The holiday is only 1 day long. This is to prevent people from working for 7 continuous days since 2014. Sometimes shift the Sundays nearby to make a 4-day holiday. People may need to work for 6 continuous days after the holiday.
Tuesday or Thursday: Shift the Saturdays and Sundays nearby to make a 3-day holiday. People may need to work for 6 continuous days before or after the holiday.
Saturday or Sunday: The public holiday is transferred to Monday.

Additional holidays for specific social groups
In addition to these holidays, applicable to the whole population, there are four official public holidays applicable to specific sections of the population:

The closeness of Labor Day and Youth Day resulted in an unexpectedly long break for schools in 2008 - the Youth Day half-holiday entitlement had been largely forgotten because it has been subsumed into the Golden Week.

Traditional holiday scheme

Ethnic minorities' holidays
There are public holidays celebrated by certain ethnic minorities in certain regions, which are decided by local governments. The following are holidays at the provincial level.

The following are traditional holidays at the prefectural level, and there are more at lower-level divisions, i.e. county-level.

In addition, the following autonomous prefectures celebrate their founding date ( or ). Generally, the government takes one day off to all people working in such prefectures.

Novel holidays
Some Chinese young adults have begun to celebrate 11 November as Singles Day because of the many ones (1s) and many singles in the date.

Serfs Emancipation Day (March 28) was established in Tibet in 2009.

See also
 List of annual events in China 
 Traditional Chinese holidays
 Public holidays in Hong Kong
 Public holidays in Taiwan

Notes

References

External links
 

 
People's Republic of China culture
China
Holidays

ja:中華人民共和国#祝祭日